Barst is a commune in the Moselle department in Grand Est in northeastern France.

The village is situated on the N56 road.

Population

See also
 Communes of the Moselle department

References

External links
 

Communes of Moselle (department)